Radio Džungla or Džungla Radio is a Bosnian group of commercial radio stations, broadcasting from Doboj, Bosnia and Herzegovina. It broadcasts a variety of programs such as news, music, morning and talk shows. A network of Radio Džungla radio stations is available on three FM frequencies in the Doboj and Banja Luka area, Zenica-Doboj Canton and parts of Bosanska Posavina and via two Internet radio stations.

Radio stations

Radio Džungla 1
Radio Džungla or I program was launched on 22 December 1997 by company Džungla d.o.o. Doboj and it is the most listened radio station in the Doboj region.

Estimated number of listeners of Radio Džungla is around 415.570. This radio station broadcasts current folk and turbo-folk music.

 Frequencies:
 Kotor Varoš  
 Doboj 
 Doboj

Radio Džungla 2
Radio Džungla 2 or II program is  internet radio station (Listen live) dedicated to the greatest hits of domestic music (Balkan music) operated by Radio Džungla.

Radio Džungla 3
Radio Džungla 3 or III program is internet radio station (Listen live) dedicated to the best foreign novelties, party / urban mix of music operated by Radio Džungla.

See also 
 List of radio stations in Bosnia and Herzegovina
 Radio Doboj
 K3 Radio Prnjavor
 Radio ZOS
 Big Radio
 Radio Glas Drine

References

External links 
 www.dzungla.net
  www.radiostanica.ba
 Communications Regulatory Agency of Bosnia and Herzegovina

Doboj
Radio stations established in 1997
Doboj